The Kyrgyz National University, named after Jusup Balasagyn, is a national university in Kyrgyzstan.

Kyrgyz National University is located in the capital city of Bishkek. It is the oldest and the largest Higher Education Institution of the Kyrgyz Republic. The institution was established on 25 October 1925 as the Kyrgyz Institute of Education. 
Recently Kyrgyz National University started its Faculty of Medicine in collaboration with LN University, India, and has thus become the first university in Central Asia to start a Faculty of Medicine in association with an Indian university. Today the Kyrgyz National University offers a 5 year MD Physician program using the teaching platform of LN University, Bhopal, India

History 
On October 25, 1925, it was decided to open the Institute of Education. This was to solve the issue of training pedagogical personnel on the territory of the Kirghiz Autonomous Socialist Soviet Republic. In 1928, by the decision of the government of the Kirghiz Autonomous Soviet Socialist Republic, the Institute of Education was transformed into the Kirghiz Central Pedagogical Technical School. In August 1929, the institution added new buildings and equipment, as well as invited specialists and teachers from other Soviet republics. On 13 January 1932, by the decision of the Council of People's Commissars of the USSR, it was transformed into the Kyrgyz State Pedagogical Institute, named after Mikhail Frunze. There were 4 faculties in the institute: physics and mathematics, biology, literature and the faculty of social sciences. The first academic year began on October 3, 1933.

On 1 September 1939, the Kyrgyz Medical Academy was established with the recruitment of 200 students. On 21 May 1951, it was transformed into the Kyrgyz State University, with the following faculties: philology, biology, physics, mathematics, history, geology and geodesy. In the decree adopted by the Council of Ministers of the Kyrgyz SSR, the Kyrgyz State University belonged to higher educational institutions of the first category. 

On December 11, 1972 it was renamed as the Kyrgyz State University on the 50th anniversary of the USSR. In 1982, the university was awarded the Soviet Union's Order of the Red Banner of Labor. On 11 August 1993, it was transformed into the Kyrgyz State National University (KGNU). By decree of President Askar Akayev on 11 May 2002, it was renamed after Yusuf Balasaghuni.

University structure 
There is the Academical Worker's Union Committee, which defends the professional interests of educators. The supervisory function in the KNU is performed by the Board of Trustees, which includes prominent public figures, scientists and graduates. There are 8 members in total in the Board of Trustees. The highest collegiate management body in the KNU is the Scientific Council, in which there are 63 members.

Faculties 
 Faculty of Medicine (LN Medical College) 
 Faculty of State and Municipal Management
 Faculty of Mathematics, Computer Science and Cybernetics
 Faculty of Physics and Electronics
Faculty of Information and Innovation Technologies
 Faculty of Chemistry and Chemical Technology
 Faculty of Biology
 Faculty of Geography and Ecology and Tourism
 Faculty of Kyrgyz Philology
 Faculty of Russian and Slavic Philology
 Faculty of History and Regional Studies
 Faculty of Journalism
 Faculty of Social and Human Sciences
 Faculty of Foreign Languages
 Kyrgyz-European Faculty
 Faculty of International Relations and Oriental Studies
 Kyrgyz-Chinese Faculty
 Pedagogical Faculty
 Faculty of Retraining and Staff Development
 Faculty of State and Municipal Management
 Faculty of Economics
 Faculty of Law
 Faculty of Management and Business
 Faculty of Medicine and Surgery

Institutions 
 Kyrgyz-Chinese Confucius Institute
 Institute of Basic Sciences

Colleges 
 LN Medical College 
 Pedagogical college
 Juridical College
 College of Economics
 Kyrgyz-Chinese College
 IT College

Centers, departments, departments and sectors 
 Korean Language Center
 Turkish Language Center
 Turkish Resource Center named after Aziz Sancar 
 Japanese Language Center
 Department of International Cooperation
 Press Service
 Center for Language Studies
 General Department
 Central Archive
 Sector for Civil Defense and Special Mobilization Work
 Department of Legal Work
 Human Resources Department
 Educational-Methodical Management
Department of Informatization and Coordination of Academic Work
 Sector of Licensing, Accreditation and Methodical Work
 Dispatching Service
 Department for the Preparation and Issuance of Documents on Education
 Department of Postgraduate Study, Doctoral Studies and Magistracy
 Scientific Library named after Asanbek Tabaldiev 
 Department of Information Technology and Computer Maintenance
 State Language Department
 Educational Work Department 
 Practice and Employment Sector
 Scientific-Research Center "Atmosphere Monitoring"
 Youth Committee
 Council of Young Scientists
 Alumni Association

Chairs 
The National Gymnasium of the KNU and the Department of Physical Culture of Sports operate from the KNU campus. KNU housese 61 academical departments in 19 faculties.

Vestnik KNU 

The university's magazine, Vestnik, has been published since 1997. Vestnik is a scientific, educational, and informational publication registered by the Ministry of Justice of the Kyrgyz Republic.

Vestnik is included on the list of leading peer-reviewed scientific journals and publications recommended by the Higher Attestation Commission of the Kyrgyz Republic. The license agreement on the inclusion of the magazine in the list of publications the system of the Russian Science Citation Index (RSCI) was signed on 1 March 2016.

Educational process in KNU 
The educational process in KNU takes place in the following directions:
 Undergraduate: on campus and in absentia; 56 programs.
 Five year study: on campus and in absentia; 5 programs.
 Magistracy: on campus and in absentia; 32 programs.
 Secondary vocational education: on campus and in absentia; 14 programs.
 At the Faculty of Economics and Pedagogy in the city of Osh - in absentia; 10 programs.
The educational process follows the Bologna Process.

KNU Rectors 
Below is a list of rectors of KNU.
 1951-1954 - B. Zhamgyrchinov 
 1954-1960 - B. Yunusaliev 
 1960-1977 - S. Tabyshaliev 
 1977-1979 - M. Imanaliev 
 1979-1986 - K. Otorbaev 
 1986-1992 - U. Asanov 
 1992-1998 - S. Toktomyshev 
 1998-2000 - A. Borubayev 
 2000-2005 - A. Kakeev 
 2005-2006 - I. Bolzhurova (Acting)
 2006-2008 - Y. Omurkanov 
 2008-2009 - A. Bekbalaev 
 2010-2011 - A. Akunov 
 2011-2014 - I. Isamidinov 
 2015-2017 - C. Adamkulova

Faculty 
As of the 2016-2017 academic year, there were 2,654 teaching staff at KNU. Of them, 1,908 people or 71.9% of the total number of full-time teachers held a scientific degree.

KNU also employs around 271 part-time or non-teaching staff. Of these employees, 183 (or 67.5%) also hold a top degree.

Counting both full-time and part-time instructors, KNU employed 67 professors and 339 associate professors.

Famous Alumni 

 Turdakun Usubaliev - First Secretary of the Central Committee of the Communist Party of Kyrgyzstan, 1961–1985
 Shabdanbai Abdyramanov - People's Writer of Kyrgyzstan
Andrey Adamovskiy - Ukrainian businessman and philanthropist
 Kazat Akmatov - People's Writer of Kirghizia
 Zholbors Zhorobekov - Kyrgyz political scientist
 Aron Brudny - Kirghiz scientist, psychologist and philosopher
 Medi Mamazairova - Kirghiz poet, Honored Worker of Culture of Kyrgyzstan
 Vladimir Ploski - Kirghiz scientist
 Shatman Sadybakasov - Kyrgyz journalist and editor
 ZAMAY - Kyrgyz-Russian rapper
 Ozgorush Sharshekeev - Kyrgyz scientist
Alykul Osmonov - Kyrgyz poet, significant for his efforts to modernizing poetry in Kyrgyzstan
 Mukhamed Tsikanov - Russian statesman from Kabardino-Balkaria
 Rakhat Achylova - sociologist and member of the Supreme Council

Library 
The KNU Scientific Library is one of the largest university libraries in Kyrgyzstan. The scientific library was established in 1932 on the basis of the Kyrgyz Pedagogical Institute.

In 1941, the library's book stock was 134,000 texts, many obtained from the universities of Moscow, Leningrad and other major cities of the USSR. In 1951 the KNU library received educational, scientific and artistic literature from universities in Odessa, Kiev, Kharkov, Kazakh and Tomsk, as well as from the Academies of Sciences of Armenia, Georgia, Uzbekistan and Ukraine.

Today, the library is located in 8 educational buildings and has 60 employees.

References

External links

 

Universities in Bishkek